Daniel Di Francesco is an Australian professional footballer who plays as a defender for Western United. He made his professional debut on 7 December 2021 in a FFA Cup match against A-League Men side Wellington Phoenix.

References

External links

Living people
Australian soccer players
Association football defenders
Genoa C.F.C. players
Western United FC players
National Premier Leagues players
Year of birth missing (living people)